Roy Francisco Posas Ferrufino (born 14 March 1984 in Danlí, El Paraíso, Honduras) is a Honduran footballer who plays for Liga Nacional de Honduras club Atlético Choloma as a left back.

Club career
He previously played for Hispano F.C. and integrated that club after F.C. Municipal Valencia sold its category due to financial problems. In 2007, he joined F.C. Motagua.

Motagua

Alcohol abuse
Luis Rodas alongside Roy Posas had a bar fight which left the Motagua's board of directors no other choice but to cut them from the team. After this happened he was left a free agent until Olimpia signed him for 2009. In June 2009 he left the club for Guatemalan side Heredia. In April 2010 Posas was fined by Heredia for work abandonment.

He returned to Honduras to play for Necaxa alongside internationals John Alston Bodden and Nery Medina and joined Atlético Choloma in summer 2011.

International career
Posas made his debut for Honduras in a March 2004 friendly match against Panama and has earned a total of 4 caps, scoring no goals.

His final international was a June 2004 friendly match against the United States.

Personal life
Roy Posas, was born in Danlí, El Paraíso, Honduras. He is the son of the current F.C. Motagua's goalkeeping coach Roy Posas. Roy Posas is the brother of Atlético Choloma team-mate Aldo Posas.

References

External links

1984 births
Living people
People from El Paraíso Department
Association football defenders
Honduran footballers
Honduras international footballers
Hispano players
F.C. Motagua players
C.D. Olimpia players
Atlético Choloma players
Liga Nacional de Fútbol Profesional de Honduras players
Honduran expatriate footballers
Honduran expatriate sportspeople in Guatemala
Expatriate footballers in Guatemala